The finals and the qualifying heats of the Women's 400 metres Individual Medley event at the 1998 European Short Course Swimming Championships were held on the first day of the competition, on Friday 11 December 1998 in Sheffield, England.

Finals

Qualifying Heats

See also
1996 Women's Olympic Games 400m Individual Medley
1997 Women's World SC Championships 400m Individual Medley
1997 Women's European LC Championships 400m Individual Medley
1998 Women's World LC Championships 400m Individual Medley
2000 Women's Olympic Games 400m Individual Medley

References
 Results
 Swimsite

F
E
1998 in women's swimming